Cheilanthes acrostica is a species of lip fern

Description

The fronds are arranged in groups.

Habitat
Cheilanthes acrostica is found in Mediterranean areas including Iberia. The season is from February to June. Its conservation status is of concern. It grows in limestone fissures, but it is also found in quartzites and sandstones and among other loose rocks. It is found at a height of 300 to 900 m.

Basis
This plant was first described in 1866.

References

acrostica